Nazi Hunter: The Beate Klarsfeld Story is a 1986 American made-for-television biographical drama film, starring Farrah Fawcett in the title role, and Tom Conti. The film also stars Geraldine Page and Catherine Allégret.

Plot 
The film tells the true story on the life of Beate Klarsfeld, a German who documented the actions that took place during the Holocaust. The film was praised for its scripts, directing, and particularly the strong performance by Fawcett, who was in the middle of transforming herself into being a serious actress. For her performance, Fawcett was nominated for a Golden Globe.

Cast
Farrah Fawcett as Beate Klarsfeld
Tom Conti as Serge Klarsfeld
Geraldine Page as Itta Halaunbrenner
Hélène Vallier as Raissa Klarsfeld
Catherine Allégret as Simone Lagrange
Féodor Atkine as Luc Pleyel
Liliane Rovère as Madame Kadousche
Philippe Laudenbach as French Official

External links 
 
 

1986 television films
1986 films
American television films
Holocaust films
Films directed by Michael Lindsay-Hogg
Films about activists
Films about Nazi hunters
Films set in West Germany